The Amenthes Fossae are a system of troughs in the Amenthes quadrangle of Mars centered  at 9.07°N and 102.68°E.  They are 850 km across and were named after a classical albedo feature.  The classical albedo feature name was based on the Egyptian name for a place where souls of the dead go (Amenthes or Duat).  The name Amenthes Fossae was approved in 1976.

The term "fossae" is used to indicate large troughs when using geographical terminology related to Mars. Troughs, sometimes also called grabens, form when the crust is stretched until it breaks, which forms two breaks with a middle section moving down, leaving steep cliffs along the sides. Sometimes, a line of pits form as materials collapse into a void that forms from the stretching.

See also
 Amenthes quadrangle

References

See also

 Fossa (geology)
 Geology of Mars 
 HiRISE
 HiWish

Valleys and canyons on Mars